Rohrbaugh Cabin — also known as Allegheny Cabin — is a historic log cabin located on the eastern slope of North Fork Mountain near Petersburg, Grant County, West Virginia, USA.

Rohrbaugh Cabin was built about 1880, and is a -story, "double pen" plan log house built of tulip poplar logs.  It measures 26 feet, two inches long, and 16 feet, 6 inches, deep.  Also on the property are a frame storage shed, a log animal pen, stone springhouse remains, and portions of the original Smokehole roadbed.

Rohrbaugh Cabin was listed on the National Register of Historic Places in 1993.

References

Houses on the National Register of Historic Places in West Virginia
Houses completed in 1880
Houses in Grant County, West Virginia
Farms on the National Register of Historic Places in West Virginia
National Register of Historic Places in Grant County, West Virginia
Vernacular architecture in West Virginia
1880 establishments in West Virginia
Log buildings and structures on the National Register of Historic Places in West Virginia